10½ is a studio album by the Dramatics released in 1980 on MCA Records. The album reached No. 14 on the Billboard Top Soul Albums chart.

Overview
10½ was produced by Larry "L.J." Reynolds and Ron Banks.

Singles
Welcome Back Home reached No. 9 on the Billboard Hot Soul Songs chart.

Critical reception

Ron Wynn of Allmusic gave a four out of five stars review saying "A celebratory album that marked their being together for over a decade, this was one of the group's best MCA/ABC albums".

Tracklisting

Personnel
Darnell Kimbrough, Cecil Womack, Dennis Harris, T.J. Tindall, Roland Bautista - guitars
Raymond Johnson, Carlton "Cotton" Kent, Rudy Robinson - keyboards
Vassal Benford - synthesizers
Greg Phillinganes - piano, Moog synthesizers
Robert Lyle - Clavinet, Rhodes and acoustic piano
John Brinson - electric piano
Nathan Lamarr Watts, Tony Green, James Williams - bass
Marvin Webb, Ricky Lawson, Darrell Jennings,  Jerome "Jerry" Jones - drums
Lorenzo Brown "Bag of Tricks", Kenneth Hudson, Carl "Butch" Small - percussion
Kerry Campbell - saxophone
Mike Patillo and The Dramatics - backing vocals

Production
Arranged By [Horns & Strings] – Donald Cooke, George Del Barrio, John Brinson, Larry "L.J." Reynolds, Wayne Henderson
Arranged By [Rhythm] – John Brinson, Larry "L.J." Reynolds, Raymond Johnson, Ron Banks, Rudy (?), Tony Green 
Coordinator [Album] – Louella Jackson
Coordinator [Production] – Brian Spears, Cynthia Sissle, Louella Jackson
Engineer [Mixing] – Allen Sides, Ellis "Pete" Bishop, Rick Gianatos
Engineer [Re-mix] – Ellis "Pete" Bishop
Engineer [Recording] – B. Benton, Dave Boyer, David Latman, Derk Devlin, J. Kaufman, Jeffrey Stewart, Jim Gallagher, Michael Evans, Michael Grace, Ellis "Pete" Bishop, Terry Tuck, Ty Blair, W. Borchers, Warren Woods
Executive-Producer – Don Davis 
Management – Forest Hamilton Personnal
Mastered By – Bernie Grundman
Producer – Larry "L.J." Reynolds, Ron Banks

References

1980 albums
MCA Records albums
Albums recorded at Total Experience Recording Studios